Miguel Bortolini Castillo (29 September 1941 – 13 August 2016) was a Mexican politician from the Party of the Democratic Revolution. From 2000 to 2003, he served as Deputy of the LVIII Legislature of the Mexican Congress representing the Federal District. He was also President of the Coyoacán borough from 2003 to 2006. Bortolini died on 13 August 2016 from cancer. He was 74.

References

1941 births
2016 deaths
Politicians from Mexico City
Members of the Chamber of Deputies (Mexico)
Party of the Democratic Revolution politicians
21st-century Mexican politicians